Saptapadi is a 1961 Indian Bengali-language romantic drama film by Ajoy Kar, starring Suchitra Sen, Uttam Kumar, Chhabi Biswas and Chhaya Debi. Music direction and playback singing for Kumar voice was by Hemanta Mukherjee and in Sen's voice by Sandhya Mukherjee. The story is based on a 1958 novel by Tarasankar Bandyopadhyay. This is regarded as one of the greatest romantic film in the history of Bengali cinema.

The film become highest grossing Bengali film in 1961.

Plot
The story takes place in pre-independence India (early 1940) when young Indian students were competing equally with Anglo-Indians in all fields, whether it be education or sports. Krishnendu (Uttam Kumar), a young Bengali Hindu medical student falls in love with an equally talented and attractive Anglo-Indian Christian woman named Rina Brown (Suchitra Sen). Both are students at the Calcutta Medical College and become close while meeting at many sports and cultural events. There is an interesting rendition of Othello within the movie; that portion of the movie was directed by Utpal Dutt. However marriage is not on the cards for them due to their differences in religion, (it is particularly opposed by Krishnendu's dad, a staunch, conservative Hindu), and they go their own ways only to unexpectedly meet again later in life.

Most of the movie is presented in flashbacks with Krishnendu pondering over the past after unexpectedly encountering a drunk and passed out Rina in a military hospital in returns.

Cast

Chhabi Biswas as Krishnendu's Father
Chhaya Devi as Rina's maid
Jennifer Kapoor as Desdemona (voice-over)
Padma Devi as Krishnendu's mother
Suchitra Sen as Rina Brown
Tarun Kumar as Krishnendu's friend
Utpal Dutt as Othello (voice-over)
Uttam Kumar as Krishnendu

Production
The film was adapted from Tarashankar's 1958 novel Saptapadi. In the novel's ending Krishendu dies, but for the audience point of view in the film ending Krishnendu doesn't die and again joins with Rina Brown because Bengali audience not accepted Uttam Suchitra separation.

Shooting commenced started in late 1959. But during the production Uttam's father is died. So film shooting was stopped. Later again in late 1960s shooting started again. This was the second film after Harano Sur produced by Uttam Kumar under his banner Alochaya Production along with Ajoy Kar. Suchitra Sen was again cast in the Rina Brown role. For the film Kumar and Sen practiced dance and reading  Shakespeare. The Othello play scene in the film had Kumar's voice-over by Utpal Dutta and Sen's voice-over by Jennifer Kapoor.

Kumar was a Mohun Bagan football fan, and in the football match scene he wanted to play in a Mohun Bagan jersey, but there was none available. He played instead in an East Bengal jersey.

The famous bike sequence from the song Ei Path Jodi Na Sesh Hoe Uttam and Suchitra did not ride the bike at all that day. The BMW bike on which this song was shot was not on the star duo ar all. Vetaran film critic Swapan Kumar Mallick unearths the famous scene in his book Mahanayak Revisited : The World of Uttam Kumar said the director Ajay Kar manipulated the close-up shots to shoot the bike scene. Multiple dummies were used in long shots. Uttam Suchitra didn't ride that BMW bike.

Music

Saptapadi'''s music was directed by Hemant Kumar, with lyrics by Gauriprasanna Mazumder. The song "Ei Path Jodi Na" was sung by Hemanta for Kumar, and by Sandha for Sen.

Soundtrack

Release and reception
During the advance booking there was long queue and police was lathi charged for the craze. The film was released at Durga Puja on 20 October 1961. There was huge craze for the film because this was the comeback of Uttam-Suchitra pair more than two years after Chaoa Pawa in 1959.

The film was massive success at the box office and breaking all the previous records. It's become all-time blockbuster and ran for 105 days in theater and collected over four times more from the budget. The film become highest grossing Bengali film in 1961.

Saptapadi entered in Moscow Film Festival in July 1963 with english subtitle as Seven Steps and nominated for Grand Pix Award.

Awards
 9th National Film Awards, 1961: Certificate of Merit for Second Best Feature Film in Bengali
1962: BFJA Award for Best Actor - Uttam Kumar 
1962: BFJA Award for Best Actress - Suchitra Sen
1963: Grand Prix [Nominee] for Ajoy Kar at Moscow International Film Festival (1963)

Legacy
The song Ei Path Jodi Na Sesh Hoe'' become evergreen blast hit and most popular romantic song in the history of Bengali cinema and the iconic bike sequence from that song remembering as one of the greatest romantic scenes ever. The song still popular among the bengali audience and used many cultural event and social issues.

References

External links

1961 films
1961 romantic drama films
Bengali-language Indian films
Films set in Kolkata
Films scored by Hemant Kumar
1960s Bengali-language films
Films directed by Ajoy Kar
Indian romantic drama films
Films based on works by Tarasankar Bandyopadhyay